Francesco Baiano (born 24 February 1968) is an Italian footballer coach and former player who was last in charge at Varese. He played as a striker for several Italian clubs throughout his playing career, and he also played for Derby County in the Premier League, between 1997 and 1999.

Club career 
Baiano was born in Naples. During his career, he played for several clubs. He first made his name with Foggia under Zdeněk Zeman, earning promotion to Serie A after winning the 1990–91 Serie B title, also winning the top-scorer award, with 22 goals, and forming a notable attacking trio alongside Giuseppe Signori and Roberto Rambaudi. He also played for Fiorentina, where he was a part of the so-called Ba-Ba strikers duo together with Gabriel Batistuta (he scored 29 goals in 118 games for Fiorentina), winning the 1995–96 Coppa Italia and the 1996 Supercoppa Italiana. During the 1992–93 Serie A season, he was the joint top assist provider in the league, with 12 assists, alongside Gianfranco Zola.

Baiano later joined Derby County in 1997, along with compatriot Stefano Eranio; together, they were among the first group of Italian footballers to play in the Premier League. He hit 16 goals in 64 games in a resurgent Derby team and was named as one of their best ever imports by the fans.

Baiano went on to play for Sangiovannese of Serie C1, a team he joined in 2002 to leave only in 2008 after a string of successful seasons with the small Tuscan side.

International career 
Baiano won two international caps for Italy, both in late 1991, under Arrigo Sacchi, although he failed to score a goal at international level. He made his debut on 13 November 1991 in Genoa, in a 1–1 draw against Norway.

Style of play 
A well-known, diminutive forward famous for his shooting technique and eye for goal, Baiano was also a quick, energetic, and dynamic player, with good technical ability and close control in tight spaces. Due to his pace, mobility, and agility, he was also often used as an outside forward; during his later career, he often played in a more creative role, as a supporting striker, or as an attacking midfielder, due to his creativity, as well as his ability to play off of teammates and provide them with assists.

Coaching career 
In 2008, Baiano was appointed player/manager of Serie D club Sansovino with little success, leaving the club at the end of the season. In 2010, he re-joined his former boss Giuseppe Sannino, becoming his main assistant at Serie B club Varese. In 2011, he followed Sannino at Serie A club Siena, and then at Palermo in 2012. He was removed as Palermo assistant together with head coach Sannino on 16 September 2012.

Honours 
Fiorentina
Serie B: 1993–94
Coppa Italia: 1995–96
Supercoppa Italiana: 1996

Foggia
Serie B: 1990–91

Individual
Serie B top scorer: 1990–91 (22 goals)
Serie A top assist provider: 1992–93
Derby County F.C. Player of the Year: 1998

References

External links 
 

1968 births
Footballers from Naples
Italian footballers
Italy international footballers
Italian expatriate footballers
Living people
U.S. Avellino 1912 players
Derby County F.C. players
Empoli F.C. players
ACF Fiorentina players
Calcio Foggia 1920 players
S.S.C. Napoli players
Parma Calcio 1913 players
U.S. Pistoiese 1921 players
Ternana Calcio players
Premier League players
Serie A players
Serie B players
Serie C players
Expatriate footballers in England
Italian expatriate sportspeople in England
Association football forwards